Liverpool Plains Shire is a local government area located in the North West Slopes region of New South Wales, Australia. The Shire was formed on 17 March 2004 by the amalgamation of Quirindi Shire with parts of Parry, Murrurundi and Gunnedah shires.

The Mayor of Liverpool Plains Shire Council is Cr. Doug Hawkins OAM.

Main towns 
The main town and Council seat is located in Quirindi. Other towns and villages in the Shire include Ardglen, Blackville, Caroona, Currabubula, Premer, Spring Ridge, Wallabadah, Werris Creek, and Willow Tree.

Heritage listings
The Liverpool Plains Shire has a number of heritage-listed sites, including:
 Pine Ridge, Windy Road: Windy Station Woolshed
 Quirindi, Main Northern railway: Quirindi railway station
 Warrah Creek, Merriwa-Murrurundi  Road: East Warrah Woolshed
 Werris Creek, Main Northern railway: Werris Creek railway station

Demographics
Aboriginal and Torres Strait Islander people made up 10.9 per cent of the population, which was three times higher than the national and state averages of 2.5 per cent. The median age of people in the Liverpool Plains Shire was 44 years, which was significantly higher than the national median of 37 years. Children aged 0 – 14 years made up 19.5 per cent of the population and people aged 65 years and over made up 20.2 per cent of the population. Of people in the area aged 15 years and over, 50.8 per cent were married and 12.1 per cent were either divorced or separated.

Population growth in the Liverpool Plains Shire between the 2006 census and the 2011 census was −0.80 per cent. When compared with total population growth of Australia for the same period, being 8.32 per cent, population growth in the Liverpool Plains Shire local government area was significantly lower than the national average. The median weekly income for residents within the Liverpool Plains Shire was significantly lower than the national average.

At the 2011 census, the proportion of residents in the Liverpool Plains Shire local government area who stated their ancestry as Australian or Anglo-Saxon exceeded 88 per cent of all residents (national average was 65.2 per cent). In excess of 75% of all residents in the Liverpool Plains Shire nominated a religious affiliation with Christianity at the 2011 census, which was much higher than the national average of 50.2 per cent. Meanwhile, as at the census date, compared to the national average, households in the Liverpool Plains Shire local government area had a significantly lower than average proportion (2.1 per cent) where two or more languages are spoken (national average was 20.4 per cent); and a significantly higher proportion (94.5 per cent) where English only was spoken at home (national average was 76.8 per cent).

Council

Current composition and election method
Liverpool Plains Shire Council is composed of seven Councillors elected proportionally as a single ward. All Councillors are elected for a fixed four-year term of office. The Mayor is elected by the Councillors at the first meeting of the Council. The most recent election was held on 10 September 2016, and the makeup of the Council is as follows:

The current Council, elected in 2016, in order of election, is:

Geography

The Liverpool Plains have a generally flat to undulating terrain formed from the remnants of old volcanoes such as that of the Liverpool Ranges to the southwest. To the south and east, it merges into the higher and cooler Northern Tablelands.

The Liverpool Plains is generally regarded as the richest agricultural region in Australia owing to its rich black soils, which originally supported a mixed grassland vegetation containing both annual and perennial grasses, which early in the region's history were used to feed cattle and sheep.

Wheat and cotton are the chief crops, although production fluctuates wildly according to rainfall and soil erosion is a major problem occurring both after droughts and floods. The climate is hot in summer, mild in winter, and of moderate rainfall. Temperatures in summer frequently exceed  and make cropping without irrigation risky without sophisticated meteorological forecasting techniques.

References

External links

 
Local government areas of New South Wales
New England (New South Wales)